Tony Sings for Two is a 1961 studio album by Tony Bennett, accompanied by the pianist Ralph Sharon. With Bill Evans, Bennett would make two further albums accompanied by solo piano.

Track listing
 "I Didn't Know What Time It Was" (Richard Rodgers, Lorenz Hart) – 1:24
 "Bewitched, Bothered and Bewildered" (Rodgers, Hart) – 2:30
 "Nobody's Heart" (Rodgers, Hart) – 2:08
 "I'm Thru with Love" (Gus Kahn, Fud Livingston, Matty Malneck) – 3:15
 "My Funny Valentine" (Rodgers, Hart) – 2:36
 "The Man That Got Away" (Harold Arlen, Ira Gershwin) – 3:52
 "Where or When" (Rodgers, Hart) – 2:09
 "A Sleepin' Bee" (Arlen, Truman Capote) – 3:23
 "Happiness Is a Thing Called Joe" (Arlen, Yip Harburg) – 2:20
 "Mam'selle" (Mack Gordon, Edmund Goulding) – 2:40
 "Just Friends" (John Klenner, Sam M. Lewis) – 1:36
 "Street of Dreams" (Lewis, Victor Young) – 2:11
 "Skylark" (Hoagy Carmichael, Johnny Mercer) – 2:31 Bonus track on CD reissue

Personnel
 Tony Bennett - vocals
 Ralph Sharon - piano

References

1961 albums
Tony Bennett albums
Albums produced by Mitch Miller
Columbia Records albums
Albums recorded at CBS 30th Street Studio